The Sixth Army of the Ottoman Empire (Turkish: Altıncı Ordu) was one of the field armies of the Ottoman Army. It was formed in the middle 19th century during Ottoman military reforms.

Formations

Order of Battle, 1877
In 1877, it was stationed in Baghdad. It was composed of:

Infantry: Six line regiments and six rifle battalion.
Cavalry: Two line regiments.
Artillery: One line regiment (9 batteries).
Engineer: One sapper company.

Order of Battle, 1908 
After the Young Turk Revolution and the establishment of the  Second Constitutional Era on July 3, 1908, new government initiate a major military reform. Army headquarters were modernized. Its operational area was Mesopotamia. It commanded the following active divisions: The Sixth Army also had inspectorate functions for four Redif (reserve) divisions:

Sixth Army
11th Infantry Division (On Birinci Fırka)
12th Infantry Division (On İkinci Fırka)
6th Infantry Division (Altıncı Fırka)
15th Artillery Brigade (On Beşinci Topçu Tugayı)
 Redif divisions of the Sixth Army (name of the division denotes its location)
21st Baghdad Reserve Infantry Division (Yirmi Birinci Bağdad Redif Fırkası)
22nd Basra Reserve Infantry Division (Yirmi İkinci Basra Redif Fırkası)
23rd Kelkit Reserve Infantry Division (Yirmi Üçüncü Kelkit Redif Fırkası)
24th Musul Reserve Infantry Division (Yirmi Dördüncü Musul Redif Fırkası)

World War I

Order of Battle, August 1914 
In August 1914, the army was structured as follows:

Sixth Army (Commander: Cavit Pasha)
XII Corps
35th Division, 36th Division
XIII Corps
37th Division

Order of Battle, Late April 1915 
In late April 1915, the army was structured as follows:

Sixth Army
35th Division
Provisional Infantry Division

Order of Battle, Late Summer 1915 
In late Summer 1915, the army was structured as follows:

Sixth Army
Iraq Area Command
XIII Corps
35th Division, 38th Division
XVIII Corps
45th Division

Order of Battle, January 1916 
In January 1916, the army was structured as follows:

Sixth Army
Iraq Area Command
XIII Corps
35th Division, 52nd Division
XVIII Corps
45th Division, 51st Division

Order of Battle, August 1916 
In August 1916, the army was structured as follows:

XIII Corps
2nd Division, 4th Division, 6th Division
XVIII Corps
35th Division, 45th Division, 51st Division, 52nd Division

Order of Battle, December 1916 
In December 1916, the army was structured as follows:

XIII Corps
2nd Division, 4th Division, 6th Division
XVIII Corps
45th Division, 51st Division, 52nd Infantry Division

Order of Battle, August 1917, January 1918, June 1918 
In August 1917, January, June 1918, the army was structured as follows:

XIII Corps
2nd Division, 6th Division
XVIII Corps
14th Division, 51st Division, 52nd Division
46th Division

Order of Battle, September 1918 
In September 1918, the army was structured as follows:

XIII Corps
2nd Division, 6th Division
XVIII Corps
14th Division, 46th Division

After Mudros

Order of Battle, November 1918 
In November 1918, the army was structured as follows:

XIII Corps
2nd Division, 6th Division

Sources

External links

Field armies of the Ottoman Empire
Military units and formations of the Ottoman Empire in World War I
Baghdad vilayet